Paul Bassett Davies, also known as Paul Bassett, is a British actor and writer.

Career 
Davies' writing credits include Spitting Image; Alas Smith and Jones; Rory Bremner; Jasper Carrot; Brogue Male; KYTV; Hello Mum; Up Your News; Midweek on BBC Radio 4; News Huddlines and At Home with the Hardys (with Jeremy Hardy).

His awards include Best Film at New York Film and Video Festival and IVCA Best Script award. He has also scripted music videos for, among many others, Kate Bush and Ken Russell.

Film 
Davies was a scriptwriter for The Magic Roundabout film and Grass Roots.

Radio 
Davies appeared as a performer in the following shows:
Unnatural Acts
At Home with the Hardys
Jeremy Hardy Speaks to the Nation
The Long Hot Satsuma

Novels 
Davies is the author of three novels under the name of Paul Bassett Davies. Utter Folly: A High Comedy of Bad Manners was self-published in 2012 and his second novel, Dead Writers In Rehab was published through the crowdfunding online publishing platform, Unbound, in 2017. Stone Heart Deep was published in 2021.

Notes

External links 

 Paul B. Davies Radio Plays

Year of birth missing (living people)
Living people
British male television actors
British male screenwriters
Place of birth missing (living people)